The Gazette is the official newspaper of Memorial University of Newfoundland, located in St. John's, Newfoundland.

See also
List of newspapers in Canada

Newspapers published in St. John's, Newfoundland and Labrador
Memorial University of Newfoundland
Newspapers established in 1949
Weekly newspapers published in Newfoundland and Labrador
1949 establishments in Newfoundland and Labrador